Miguelitos are a type of cream filled puff pastry, which can also be referred to as a cake. Originated in La Roda, in Castilla–La Mancha, Spain. Manuel Blanco the creator of these flaky desserts, was born in La Roda in 1925. After being a part of the military in 1960 he migrated to a place called Pamplona where his masterpiece was created. The name Miguelito came, after he decided to give his friend Miguel the first bite of his creation, from there the name had stuck. La Roda de Albacete started to be known with various pastry chefs throughout Spain, causing the expansion of the dessert.

Description
They are a quite simple traditional cake consisting of soft puff pastry with a creamy custard-like filling, with a flaky cake like crust.  and covered with sugar powder. They can be filled with milk, dark, and white chocolate along with the original cream. The all around dessert can be served hot or cold. Sizes tend to vary based on the chefs preference. In Castilla–La Mancha, Miguelitos, have also been known to be served with a cup of café con leche.

Recipe 
Miguelitos can be made in many different ways, tends to be more of a personal preference.

See also
 Custard desserts
 Pastries

References

External links
 Recipe 
 Chocolate recipe
 No cream recipe 

Castilian-La Mancha cuisine
Province of Albacete
Spanish pastries
Custard desserts
Puff pastry